The 1980–81 Cincinnati Bearcats men's basketball team represented the University of Cincinnati during the 1980–81 NCAA Division I men's basketball season. The Bearcats were led by head coach Ed Badger, as members of the Metro Conference.

Roster

Schedule

|-
!colspan=12 style=|Metro Tournament

References 

Cincinnati Bearcats men's basketball seasons
Cincinnati
Cincinnati Bearcats Basketball
Cincinnati Bearcats Basketball